The Supreme Court of New Zealand is the highest court and the court of last resort of New Zealand. It formally came into being on 1 January 2004 and sat for the first time on 1 July 2004. It replaced the right of appeal to the Judicial Committee of the Privy Council, based in London. It was created with the passing of the Supreme Court Act 2003, on 15 October 2003. At the time, the creation of the Supreme Court and the abolition of appeals to the Privy Council were controversial constitutional changes in New Zealand. The Supreme Court Act 2003 was repealed on 1 March 2017 and superseded by the Senior Courts Act 2016.

It should not be confused with New Zealand's "old" Supreme Court, which was a superior court that was established in 1841 and renamed in 1980 as the High Court of New Zealand. The name was changed in anticipation of the eventual creation of a final court of appeal for New Zealand that would be called the "Supreme Court".

Composition
The inaugural bench (with the exception of the chief justice, who had automatic appointment) were the most senior judges of the New Zealand Court of Appeal at the time. Their appointment to the new Court was said to have been based on seniority and merit. The maximum bench under statute is six judges.

Several acting judges have also been appointed to sit whenever a permanent judge was unable to do so due to illness or a conflict of interest. These judges were appointed from the retired judges of the Court of Appeal and have included Justices Sir John Henry, Sir Ted Thomas, former President of the Court of Appeal Sir Ivor Richardson and former Chief Justice Sir Thomas Eichelbaum. Acting judges only sit on substantive appeals, and not applications for leave, due to the requirement for appeals to be heard en banc by five judges.

On 4 May 2005, Attorney-General Michael Cullen announced the appointment of Justice Sir John McGrath of the Court of Appeal to the Supreme Court bench as its sixth permanent judge. On 21 February 2006, the Honourable Sir Noel Anderson (at the time President of the Court of Appeal) was appointed to the Supreme Court. Thus the promotion of the most senior Court of Appeal member has continued. This practice was broken with the appointment of Justice Bill Wilson in December 2007 after having served less than a year as a judge of the Court of Appeal.

Eligibility to be a justice of the Supreme Court

Under section 94 of the Senior Courts Act 2016 an existing judge can only be appointed a Supreme Court justice if already a member of the Court of Appeal or the High Court. If the person is not a member of either of those courts, the candidate must be appointed as a High Court judge at the same time as taking office in the Supreme Court.

Creation
While the suggestion of ending appeals to the Privy Council had been around since the Statute of Westminster Adoption Act 1947, proposals to end appeals to the Privy Council began in the late 1970s, when a Royal Commission on the judiciary canvassed arguments for replacing the Privy Council. In the early 1980s, Minister of Justice Jim McLay suggested their abolition. Proposals for an indigenous final appellate court can be traced back to 1985. In 1996, Attorney-General Paul East proposed to end the status of the Privy Council as the country's highest court of appeal. The proposal got as far as a Bill being introduced into Parliament. However, this Bill met with little support from within the National Party, and the Bill was not carried over by the next Parliament following the 1996 general election.

The policy was resurrected in 1999 by the Fifth Labour Government. A discussion paper, Reshaping New Zealand's Appeal Structure attracted 70 submissions. A year later a Ministerial Action Group was formed to assist Ministers in designing the purpose, structure and make-up of a final court of appeal. The Group's report, Replacing the Privy Council: A New Supreme Court was published in April 2002, before the general election a few months later.

On 9 December 2002, after the Labour government's re-election at the 2002 New Zealand general election, Attorney-General Margaret Wilson introduced the Supreme Court Bill to create the Supreme Court and abolish appeals to the Privy Council. A Campaign for the Privy Council was established to lobby against the abolition of appeals. Many business and community groups joined the opposition to the ending of appeals. The Monarchist League of New Zealand opposed the abolition of appeals, stating:

 
Margaret Wilson argued in favour of the Bill, stating:

Select committee 
At select committee, the Bill attracted numerous submissions for and against creating the Supreme Court. Notable supporters of the Supreme Court were former President of the Court of Appeal, Lord of Appeal in Ordinary, and Privy Councillor Lord Cooke of Thorndon and former Prime Minister Sir Geoffrey Palmer, while most senior lawyers were opposed to the change. The Monarchist League complained the majority of members of the select committee were motivated by a "republican agenda".

Opposition parties had called unsuccessfully for a national referendum on the creation of the Supreme Court. While the Bill was before the select committee, Auckland lawyer Dennis J Gates launched a petition for a non-binding citizens initiated referendum on 3 April 2003, asking the question "Should all rights of appeal to the Privy Council be abolished?". The petition failed to gain the 310,000 signatures of registered electors needed and lapsed on 2 July 2004.

Third reading 
The Supreme Court Bill passed its third reading 63 to 53. The governing Labour and Progressive parties, supported by the Greens, voted in favour, while the National, New Zealand First, ACT New Zealand, and United Future parties voted against. It received Royal Assent on 17 October 2003, with commencement on 1 January 2004.

Later changes 
In 2008, National leader John Key (then the leader of the opposition) ruled out any abolition of the Supreme Court and return to the Privy Council. The Key Government eventually repealed the Supreme Court Act 2003 and replaced it with the Senior Courts Act 2016, as part of a modernisation of judicature legislation. The reform was supported by National, Labour, the Greens, the Māori Party, ACT and United Future, and was opposed by New Zealand First.

Appointments
One issue that was particularly contentious as the Bill was being debated in Parliament was the appointment of judges to the Court, with opposition parties claiming that the Attorney-General would make partisan choices. These concerns were because the entire bench was to be appointed simultaneously, and no clear statement had been made about how they would be selected. However, the level of concern was considerably lessened when Wilson announced that the appointments would be based on merit and seniority. Appointments to the Court were expected and unsurprising. The most senior Justices on the Court of Appeal were appointed to the new Court.

Cases

One of the grounds advanced for the creation of the Court was that it would allow more people to have access to the country's highest appellate court. From 1851 until 2002, the Privy Council made 268 decisions relating to New Zealand. In the ten years from 1992–2002, only 21 decisions had been allowed with respect to New Zealand. The Supreme Court hears many more cases than were heard by the Judicial Committee of the Privy Council due to its jurisdiction being considerably broader. For example, cases in the areas of employment, criminal and family law can be heard by the Supreme Court, whereas previously cases in both areas of law could normally progress no further than the Court of Appeal. The proximity of the Court is another factor that is likely to contribute to it hearing an increased number of appeals and also allows appeals to be heard and determined considerably faster than under the former system.

The Court has heard many applications for leave. It has also heard many substantive appeals. Notable substantive cases include:
Morgan v Superintendent of Rimutaka Prison [2005] 3 NZLR 1 (retrospective penalties).
Bryson v Three Foot Six Ltd [2005] NZSC 34 (determination of employee or contractor status).
Zaoui v Attorney-General (No 2) [2006] 1 NZLR 289 (human rights of refugees in relation to national security).
R v L [2006] 3 NZLR 291 (mens rea of attempted sexual violation).
Brooker v Police [2007] NZSC 30 (test for disorderly behaviour under section 4(1)(a) of the Summary Offences Act 1981.)
Lai v Chamberlains [2007] 2 NZLR 7 (immunity of barristers from suit).
Taunoa v Attorney-General [2008] 1 NZLR 429 (remedies for Bill of Rights breach).
R v Hansen [2007] 3 NZLR 1 (burden of proof and evidential burden under Misuse of Drugs Act 1975 in relation to Bill of Rights).
Mahomed v R  [2011] NZSC 52 (admissibility of propensity evidence in criminal prosecutions).
Hamed & Ors. v R [2011] NZSC 101 (admissibility of video surveillance obtained during criminal trespass).
Taueki v R [2013] NZSC 146 (meaning of the phrase "in peaceable possession" as it relates to the Crimes Act 1961),
Environmental Defence Society v New Zealand King Salmon [2014] NZSC 38 (interpretation of the Resource Management Act).
Paki v Attorney-General (No 2) [2014] NZSC 118 ("usque ad medium filum aquae" only applies where consistent with Maori custom)
Booth v R [2016] NZSC 127, [2017] 1 NZLR 223 (determination of correct calculation for prisoner release dates)
New Health New Zealand Incorporated v South Taranaki District Council [2018] NZSC 59, [2018] NZSC 60 (legality of water fluoridation)
Peter Hugh McGregor Ellis v The King [2022] NZSC 114 (overturning of Ellis' conviction)
Make It 16 Incorporated v Attorney-General [2022] NZSC 134 (the minimum voting age of 18 years is inconsistent with the New Zealand Bill of Rights Act 1990)

Building

The Supreme Court sits in Wellington. Until the Court's new $80.7 million home was built, beside and expanding into the historic High Court building, the court was housed in temporary facilities located in the High Court in Wellington with offices located in Old Government Buildings. The building was formally opened on 18 January 2010 by Prince William.

The upper portion of the building's exterior is surrounded by a bronze screen and red glass facade. The forms were inspired by the intertwining of rātā and pohutukawa trees. The interior follows a similar theme; the court room is oval shaped with tiled walls mimicking the shape of a kauri cone.

Leave

Unlike final appellate courts in some other countries, there is no automatic right of appeal to the Supreme Court of New Zealand. All appeals are by leave granted by the Supreme Court. No lower courts may grant leave to appeal.
Leave is granted or declined based on a number of factors listed in section 74 of the Senior Courts Act, with the overarching principle being that it must be necessary in the interests of justice for the Court to hear the appeal. Leave applications may be determined by any two permanent judges of the court based on the written submission of the parties without an oral hearing; however, they are normally determined by a panel of three. The judges determining the application can decide to hold an oral hearing if they wish.

This system is also in place in the United Kingdom where the Supreme Court of the United Kingdom, the highest court of appeal in the United Kingdom, also must grant leave for appeal for cases to be heard before it. The same is true for appeals to the Court of Final Appeal of Hong Kong. Similarly, most litigants seeking to appeal to the Constitutional Court of South Africa, Supreme Court of the United States, Supreme Court of Canada or High Court of Australia require leave before their case can be heard – although there are some exceptions to this in the latter three courts.

Comparison to the Privy Council and criticism 
Since its foundation, the Supreme Court has been subject to "unprecedented public criticism". The quality of several Supreme Court judgments have been criticised in New Zealand and overseas, and concerns expressed about the impact on the country's case law and international reputation. The major criticisms are the Supreme Court's lack of experience and its membership being drawn initially from the Court of Appeal. Defenders of the court argue that it has provided easier access to the courts. They also note that the argument that the court would not be independent has been disproved by the Supreme Court's willingness to overrule decisions of the Court of Appeal.

Prior to discontinuation the Privy Council heard up to 12 cases from New Zealand a year. From its creation through May 2012, the Supreme Court heard an average of 29 substantive appeals annually.

Judges

Current judges

Former judges

See also
 Judiciary of New Zealand
 Constitution of New Zealand

References

External links 

 

 
Constitution of New Zealand
New Zealand
New Zealand court system
2004 establishments in New Zealand
Judiciary of New Zealand
2004 in New Zealand law
Courts and tribunals established in 2004